Freshwater Corners (known by locals as Three Corners) is an unincorporated community in Humboldt County, California. All residents of this area have Eureka, California addresses.

References

Unincorporated communities in Humboldt County, California
Unincorporated communities in California